Downstate Illinois refers to the part of the U.S. state of Illinois south of the Chicago metropolitan area, which is in the northeast corner of the state and has been dominant in American history, politics, and culture. It is defined as the part of the state that lies west of Chicago and its suburbs but at the same or greater latitude. Prior to the issuance of 2000 Census results, when it became part of the Chicago metropolitan area, even DeKalb (located 65 miles west of Chicago) was often considered to be "downstate".

Downstate Illinois is divided into several subregions: Northern Illinois, Central Illinois, and Southern Illinois, which in turn are divided into more subregions.

The term has been part of the northern Illinois residence lingo for decades, and is commonly used by the media. The Illinois General Assembly regularly uses the term in the titles of bills it passes.

Definition
Downstate Illinois lacks a precise definition. Various boundaries that have been used are the Chicago city limits, the boundaries of Cook County, the collar counties, all of Illinois not contained in the Chicago media market, Interstate 80, and Bloomington.

Major cities

Most of the state's largest cities (six of the top ten) are concentrated in and around the Chicago area, but several mid-sized cities exist in the downstate area as well.

See also
Forgottonia

References

Regions of Illinois